The Carlos Palanca Memorial Awards for Literature winners for the year 2008 (rank, name of author, title of winning entry (italicized, in parentheses)). The awarding ceremonies were held on September 1, 2008.


Filipino division 
Dulang Pampelikula
First prize: Michiko Yamamoto / Emmanuel Dela Cruz (1434456 – “The Singalong Singhs”)
Second prize: Dennis Marasigan (Joy)
Third prize: Alfred Aloysius Adlawan (Padyak)

Dulang Ganap Ang Haba
First prize: No winner
Second prize: No winner
Third prize: No winner

Dulaang May Isang Yugto
First prize: Floy C. Quintos (Ang Kalungkutan ng mga Reyna)
Second prize: Debbie Ann Tan (Teroristang Labandera)
Third prize: Allan B. Lopez (Masaganang Ekonomiya)

Sanaysay
First prize: Jing Panganiban-Mendoza (Ang Pagbabalik ng Prinsesa ng Banyera)
Second prize: Eugene Y. Evasco (Agaw-buhay)
Third prize: Michael M. Coroza

Kabataan sanaysay
First prize: No Winner
Second prize: No Winner
Third prize: Allen D. Yuarata (Nang Dumating si Joe)

Tula
First prize: Mikael de Lara Co (Ang Iba’t-ibang Ngalan ng Hangin)
Second prize: Renato L. Santos (Sari-saring Salaghati... (At good-bye-my-kangkungan))
Third prize: Niles Jordan Breis (“Rubrica” mga lakbay nilay at pagbubunyag)

Maikling Kuwentong Pambata
First prize: No winner
Second prize: April Jade B. Imson (Si Karding at ang Buwaya)
Third prize: Allan Alberto N. Derain (May Tatlong Kurimaw)

Maikling Kuwento
First prize: Maria Lucille Roxas (Game Show)
Second prize: Lemuel E. Garcellano (Anghel Kalahig)
Third prize: Rommel B. Rodriguez (Kabagyan)

Nobela
Grand prize winner – Norman Wilwayco (Gerilya)

Regional division 
Maikling Kuwento - Cebuano
First prize: Macario D. Tiu (Tsuru)
Second prize: Edgar S. Godin (Bingo)
Third prize: Lilia Tio (Sapatos)

Maikling Kuwento - Hiligaynon
First prize: Leoncio P. Deriada (And Pagbalik sang Babaylan)
Second prize: Alice Tan Gonzales (Dawata, Anak)
Third prize: Marcel Milliam (Bitay)

Maikling Kuwento - Iluko
First prize: Danilo Antalan (Dangilen)
Second prize: Ariel Tabag (Littugaw)
Third prize: Aurelio Agcaoili (Alegoria Uno)

English division 
Full-length play
First prize: Peter Solis Nery (The Passion of Jovita Fuentes)
Second prize: No winner
Third prize: No winner

One-act play
First prize: Maria Clarissa N. Estuar (Anybody’s Revolution)
Second prize: Percival Intalan (Secret Identities)
Third prize: Joachim Emilio B. Antonio (Newspaper Dance)

Poetry
First prize: Francis C. Macansantos (Morphic Variations)
Second prize: Anna Maria Katigbak
Third prize: Marie La Viña (The Gospel According to the Blind Man)

Short story
First prize: Ian Fermin Rosales Casocot (Things You Don’t Know)
Second prize: Tara F.T. Sering (Good People)
Third prize: Nadine L. Sarreal (Night Sounds)

Short story For Children
First prize: Celestine Marie G. Trinidad (The Storyteller and the Giant)
Second prize: No winner
Third prize: Kathleen Aton-Osias (The Mapangarap and the Dream Trees)

Essay
First prize: Jose Claudio B. Guerrero (Talking to a Fu Dog on a Wedding Afternoon)
Second prize: Katrina Stuart Santiago (Mirrors)
Third prize: Jhoanna Lynn Cruz (Sapay Coma)

Kabataan essay
First prize: Miro Frances Dimaano Capili (Rated X)
Second prize: Cristina Gratia F. Tantengco (Things that Lie Beyond the Postcards)
Third prize: Elfermin Manalansan Mallari, Jr. (The Roads and Dreams that Meander)

Novel
Grand prize winner – Miguel Syjuco (Ilustrado)

References
 

Palanca Awards
Palanca